Gerald McCann is a Democratic Party politician and former mayor of Jersey City.

Gerald McCann may also refer to: 
Gerald McCann (fashion designer), British fashion designer active from the 1950s to 1990s
Gerry McCann, father of Madeleine McCann